Verliefd (English: In Love) is the fourth studio album by the Belgian girlgroup K3. The album was released on 9 September 2002 through label Niels William. The album is a typical kids-pop album with songs about love. It reached the peak position in both the Flemish and Dutch album charts.

Three singles were released to promote the album: "Feest", a song about partying in the whole world, "Papapa", a song about loving your father, and "Verliefd", a sweet song about being in love. In 2009 a reissue was released which contains the original songs and karaoke versions of all the songs.

Track listing

Chart performance

Weekly charts

Year-end charts

Certifications

References

2002 albums
K3 (band) albums